This is a list of Kent State Golden Flashes football players in the NFL Draft.

Key

Selections

References

Kent State

Kent State Golden Flashes NFL Draft